Ratnagiri railway station (RN) is a train station that serves the  city of Ratnagiri in the Indian state of Maharashtra.
It is the one of the main railway stations of the Konkan Railway. The station has modern facilities like elevator and escalator. The station offers free Wi-Fi. All Konkan Railway trains halt at Ratnagiri. It is 7 km away from the city. It falls under the Ratnagiri railway division.

Administration 
Ratnagiri station lies on the Konkan Railway zone of Indian Railways that runs along the west coast of India.

Services 
The railway station has the daily connectivity to important cities of India like – Mumbai, New Delhi, Amritsar, Jaipur, Ahmedabad, Mangalore, Coimbatore, Ernakulam.

Thiruvananthapuram Rajdhani Express and Madgaon Rajdhani Express connect with Hazrat Nizamuddin railway station in New Delhi along with other trains like Mangala Lakshadweep Express, Kerala Sampark Kranti Express and Goa Sampark Kranti Express.

Other trains include Tirunelveli–Gandhidham Humsafar Express, Marusagar Express, Kochuveli–Shri Ganganagar Junction Express, Kochuveli–Lokmanya Tilak Terminus Garib Rath Express, Netravati Express, Konkan Kanya Express, Mandovi Express, Matsyagandha Express, Tutari Express, Mumbai CSMT–Karmali Tejas Express, Dadar–Madgaon Jan Shatabdi Express connect Madgaon to Mumbai.

All the seasonal summer special trains, Ganesh Chaturthi special trains, and Christmas special trains halt at Ratnagiri railway station.

The railway station has all the modern facilities that has to offer, escalators and lifts on each platforms, handicap-friendly environment and access.  Canteen, etc.

There is also a goods yard on the west side of rail station. A passenger coach depot is also being built adjoining to the station.

Gallery

See also 

Rajdhani Express
Tejas Express
Duronto Express
Humsafar Express
AC Express (Indian Railways)

References 

Railway stations along Konkan Railway line
Railway stations in Ratnagiri district
Ratnagiri railway division
Ratnagiri